Gelophaula aridella is a species of moth of the family Tortricidae. It is found in New Zealand.

The wingspan is 15 mm. The forewings are dark fuscous, somewhat darker along the costa and greyish externally. The hindwings are fuscous. Adults have been reported on wing from December to January.

References

Moths described in 1934
Archipini
Moths of New Zealand
Endemic fauna of New Zealand
Endemic moths of New Zealand